The Congressional Review Act (CRA) is a law that was enacted by the United States Congress under House Speaker Newt Gingrich as Subtitle E of the Contract with America Advancement Act of 1996 and signed into law by President Bill Clinton on March 29, 1996. The law empowers Congress to review, by means of an expedited legislative process, new federal regulations issued by government agencies and, by passage of a joint resolution, to overrule a regulation. Once a rule is thus repealed, the CRA also prohibits the reissuing of the rule in substantially the same form or the issuing of a new rule that is substantially the same "unless the reissued or new rule is specifically authorized by a law enacted after the date of the joint resolution disapproving the original rule" (5 U.S. Code § 801(b)(2)). Congress has a window of time lasting 60 legislative days (i.e., days that Congress is actually in session, rather than simple calendar days) to disapprove of any given rule by simple majority vote; otherwise, the rule will go into effect at the end of that period.

Prior to 2017, the CRA had been successfully invoked only once to overturn a rule (in 2001). In January 2017, with a new Republican president (Donald Trump), the Republican-controlled 115th Congress began passing a series of disapproval resolutions to overturn a variety of rules issued under the Obama administration. Ultimately, fourteen such resolutions repealing Obama administration rules were passed and signed into law; a fifteenth resolution was passed by the House but failed in the Senate. Because of the shortness of legislative sessions during the 114th Congress, the 115th Congress was able to target rules issued by the Obama administration as far back as May 2016. In late 2017 and early 2018 Congress passed two resolutions repealing Consumer Financial Protection Bureau rules made by former President Obama's CFPB Director, Richard Cordray, who did not leave his post until late 2017.

Procedure
The law states that, as a condition precedent, an agency promulgating a covered rule must submit a report to each House of Congress and to the Comptroller General that contains a copy of the rule, a concise general statement describing the rule (including whether it is a major rule), and the proposed effective date of the rule. A covered rule cannot take effect if the report is not submitted.

The law provides a procedure for expedited consideration in the Senate. If the committee to which a joint resolution is referred has not reported it within 20 calendar days after the rule is received by Congress and published in the Federal Register, the committee may be discharged from further consideration by a written petition of 30 Senators, when the measure is placed on the calendar, and it is in order at any time for a Senator to move to proceed to the joint resolution. If the Senate agrees to the non-debatable motion to proceed, debate on the floor is limited to up to 10 hours and no amendments to the resolution or motions to proceed to other business are in order. The Senate may then pass the joint resolution with a simple majority. A joint resolution of disapproval meeting certain criteria cannot be filibustered. For a regulation to be invalidated under the CRA, the Congressional resolution of disapproval must be either signed by the President or passed over the President's veto by two thirds of both Houses of Congress.

Repeal proposal
On May 16, 2017, Senators Cory Booker and Tom Udall introduced , a bill to repeal the Congressional Review Act; the bill received no action.

Expanded possibilities
The CRA emerged as an attractive tool in the 115th Congress because it provides one of the few avenues for Senate action that avoids the ordinary 60-vote cloture requirement. As a result, several new theories about how to expand the reach and power of the CRA have been developed.

With regard to previously unsubmitted regulations
One previously under-appreciated provision of the CRA is its stipulation that rules do not go into effect until after they have been submitted to Congress. Since many rules over the last 20 years have never been submitted to Congress, some legal scholars have proposed that the rules are not actually in effect and may still be eligible to be overturned even if they were passed many years ago. According to the Pacific Legal Foundation (PLF), that could be accomplished in one of three different ways: (1) a rule could be submitted to Congress now by the White House and then repealed by a joint resolution under the CRA, (2) the White House could publish notice that a rule not in effect is being withdrawn or abandoned, or (3) a rule could be thrown out by a court on the grounds that it was never in effect.

A variation on the idea was pursued later in the 115th Congress by Senator Pat Toomey (R-PA), who was looking for additional deregulatory pathways. Toomey has criticized government regulators for "regulat[ing] by guidance rather than through the process they're supposed to use, which is the Administrative Procedure Act" and has argued that an official determination that a particular piece of guidance "rises to the significance of being a rule" would mean that "from that moment the clock starts on the CRA opportunity". Thus, in response to a request from Senator Toomey for a determination on whether a 2013 auto-lending guidance rule issued by the CFPB qualified as a "rule" under the terms of the CRA, the GAO issued an opinion on December 5, 2017, saying that it did, thus launching the 60-day CRA window according to the opinion of the Senate parliamentarian. Subsequently, S.J. Res. 57 was introduced on March 22, 2018, to repeal the CFPB rule, an effort that has been described as a "trial balloon" and, if successful, would open the door to a greatly-expanded application of the CRA to various "rules" issued over the last few decades. Other possible applications are already being explored, including a 2016 plan from the Bureau of Land Management, which the GAO confirmed was a rule for CRA purposes in response to a request from Senator Lisa Murkowski (R-AK). On the other hand, the success of S.J. Res. 57 could prove to be a Pandora's box, setting a dangerous precedent and calling into question the legitimacy of many other rules in a way could create a climate of uncertainty and jeopardy for those who have been following or relying on them. S.J. Res. 57 was signed into law on May 21, 2018.

With regard to preemptive regulations
Another possible avenue for expanding the power of the CRA concerns its prohibition against any regulation being passed if it is "substantially similar" to one already repealed under the CRA without explicit Congressional approval. Some Republicans have therefore suggested that the Trump administration could preemptively introduce liberal regulations with the intention of having them immediately repealed under the CRA and thereby preventing a future Democratic administration from issuing substantially similar regulations.

Use
Despite its passage in 1996, the Congressional Review Act was not used to send any resolutions of disapproval to the President's desk during the remainder of the presidency of Bill Clinton. President George W. Bush signed the only resolution of disapproval sent to him by Congress. Congress passed five resolutions of disapproval during the presidency of Barack Obama, but he vetoed all of them. In the first four months of his term, President Donald Trump signed fourteen resolutions of disapproval into law.  At the White House, Andrew Bremberg, Marc Short, and Rick Dearborn coordinated with aides of Senator Mitch McConnell to use the CRA, creating an Excel spreadsheet of target regulations, eventually being able to eliminate over twice as many as they had anticipated. The later enactment, in November 2017, of H.J. Res. 111 was notable for being the first time that a president signed a CRA resolution against a regulation issued during his own administration.

Successful uses
The following is a complete list of successful uses of the CRA, as of June 30, 2021 (ordered according to when they became law):

Pending

Awaiting action by the President
The following resolution has been passed by both houses of Congress and is awaiting action by the President.

Unsuccessful attempts

Vetoed by President
The following is a complete list of joint resolutions under the Congressional Review Act that were vetoed by the president after having been passed by both houses of Congress. Five of the six instances came under President Obama, and represented nearly half of the 12 regular vetoes he issued during his eight years in office.

Passed by only one chamber

Did not pass either chamber

References

Further reading
Richard S. Beth. The Congressional Review Act and Possible Consolidation into a Single Measure of Resolutions Disapproving Regulations. Washington, D.C.: Congressional Research Service, 2009.
Maeve P. Carey. What Is the Effect of Enacting a Congressional Review Act Resolution of Disapproval? Washington, D.C.: Congressional Research Service, 2018.
Daniel Cohen and Peter L. Strauss. "Congressional Review of Agency Regulations." Administrative Law Review. 49 (Winter 1997):95.
Curtis W. Copeland. Congressional Review Act: Disapproval of Rules in a Subsequent Session of Congress. Washington, D.C.: Congressional Research Service, 2008.
Curtis W. Copeland. Congressional Review Act: Rules Not Submitted to GAO and Congress. Washington, D.C.: Congressional Research Service, 2009.
The Mysteries of the Congressional Review Act. 122 Harvard Law Review 2162 (2009).
Morton Rosenberg. Congressional Review of Agency Rulemaking: An Update and Assessment of The Congressional Review Act after a Decade. Washington, D.C.: Congressional Research Service, 2008.

Acts of the 104th United States Congress
United States federal government administration legislation